Shu Shengyou (born December 1936) is a People's Republic of China politician. He was born in Yushan, Jiangxi, and was twice governor of his home province.

Shu was a member of the 15th CPC Central Committee with Party secretary Shu Huiguo and deputy Party secretary Huang Zhiquan.

References

1936 births
Governors of Jiangxi
Living people